No. 9 Squadron RCAF was a Royal Canadian Air Force squadron active during the Second World War, primarily in an anti-submarine role with Western Air Command and was based at Bella Bella, British Columbia.  The squadron flew the Supermarine Stranraer, Consolidated Canso and Consolidated Catalina before disbanding on 1 September 1944.

References

Citations

Bibliography

Royal Canadian Air Force squadrons (disbanded)
Military units and formations of Canada in World War II